Msun may refer to:

 FreeBSD's implementation of the C mathematical functions (based on Sun Mycrosystem's FDLIBM)
 Solar mass —